= Science Journal =

Science Journal could refer to:

- Scientific journals in general
- Science (journal), also known as Science Magazine, published by the American Association for the Advancement of Science
- New Scientist, which absorbed a magazine called Science Journal in 1971 and was then briefly known as New Scientist and Science Journal
